The World Headquarters of the Bektashi or Bektashi World Center (often simply known in Albanian as the Kryegjyshata) is the international headquarters of the Bektashi Order, a Sufi order. It is located on Dhimitër Kamarda Street at the eastern edge of Tirana city, Albania. It serves as the centre of the Albanian Bektashi Order.

The headquarters also has a museum, library, and archives.

History
Before the secularization of Turkey in 1925, the Haji Bektash Veli Complex in Hacıbektaş, Turkey was home to the pir evi (Turkish for "pir's house") of Haji Bektash Veli, which served as the international headquarters of the Bektashi Order. Atatürk's 1925 ban on all dervish orders caused the exodus of the Bektashi Order to Albania in 1925, and the complex was closed for religious use. As a result, the administrative seat of the Bektashi Order was shifted to the World Headquarters of the Bektashi in Tirana, Albania in 1930.

In 1930, Sali Njazi, the 1st Dedebaba of the Bektashi Order, established the World Headquarters of the Bektashi movement in Tirana. Sali Njazi had originally planned to set up the headquarters in Melçan, Korça (which had served as the first de facto headquarters of the Albanian Bektashi community during the 1920s), but finally decided to build it in Tirana instead.  The construction of the headquarters was finished in 1941 during the Italian occupation of Albania.

The headquarters were closed in 1967, when Albanian Communist dictator Enver Hoxha shut down all religious organizations. On 27 January 1991, a temporary committee for the resurrection of the Bektashi Community was established in Tirana. Since that year, the new community has worked hard to revive the traditions of Bektashism in Albania. The World Headquarters in Tirana was officially reopened on 22 March 1991 on Sultan Nevruz.

Headquarters campus

Tyrbes
The tyrbes (holy tombs) of several dedebabas, including Kamber Ali, Abaz Hilmi, and Ahmet Myftar, are buried at the Kryegjyshata.

Museum
The Bektashi Museum (or Bektashee Museum) was officially inaugurated on 7 September 2015.

Library
The Bektashi Library (or Bektashee Library) was officially inaugurated on 7 September 2015.

Archives
The archives contain many historic documents in various languages such as Albanian, Arabic, Ottoman Turkish, English, French, and Italian, with the earliest document dating back to 1847. There are also photograph collections, audio tapes, and microfilms. The audio collection preserves rare recordings of Bektashi musical traditions.

Gallery

See also

List of Bektashi tekkes and shrines

References

External links

Bektashi Order
Buildings and structures in Tirana
Religion in Tirana